Monochamus sparsutus is a species of beetle in the family Cerambycidae. It was described by Léon Fairmaire in 1889.

References

sparsutus
Beetles described in 1889